Howard Lewis Rosenthal (4 March 1939 – 28 July 2022) was an American political scientist who was professor of politics at New York University. He also taught at Carnegie-Mellon University and Princeton University, where he was the Roger Williams Straus professor of social sciences.

Rosenthal is  known for developing the multidimensional scaling application NOMINATE along with Keith T. Poole, a tool used by political scientists to compare the relative ideologies of current and past members of Congress. He authored numerous books and journal articles, including  Partisan Politics, Divided Government, and the Economy with Alberto Alesina and Polarized America: The Dance of Ideology and Unequal Riches with Nolan McCarty and Keith T. Poole.

His main areas of interest included the study of political economy, American politics, political methodology, and comparative politics.

Education
After receiving his B.S. in Economics, Politics and Science in 1960 from Massachusetts Institute of Technology, Rosenthal went on to complete his Ph.D. in Political Science at MIT in 1964.

Career
Rosenthal taught at Carnegie Mellon University, Princeton University, and New York University.

Work
As previously stated, Rosenthal wrote numerous influential books in the field of political science. These included:

 Hildebrand, David K.; James D. Laing and Howard Rosenthal. Prediction Analysis of Cross Classifications. Wiley Series in Probability and Mathematical Statistics. New York: Wiley, 1977.
 Meltzer, Allan, Romer, Thomas; and Rosenthal, Howard, eds. Carnegie Papers on Political Economy, Vol. 4, Public Choice, 44, 1, 1984.
 Alesina, Alberto, and Howard Rosenthal. Partisan Politics, Divided Government, and the Economy. New York: Cambridge University Press, 1995.
 Poole, Keith T., and Howard Rosenthal. Congress: A Political-Economic History of Roll Call Voting. New York: Oxford University Press, 1997.
 Bolton, Patrick and Howard Rosenthal, eds., Credit Markets for the Poor, New York: Russell Sage Foundation, 2005.
 McCarty, Nolan, Keith T. Poole and Howard Rosenthal. Polarized America: The Dance of Ideology and Unequal Riches, 2006. Cambridge, MA., MIT Press (Walras-Pareto lecture volume).
 Poole, Keith T., and Howard Rosenthal. Ideology in Congress. New Brunswick, Transaction Press, 2007, 2nd Rev. Edition.
 Rosenthal, Howard and David Rothman, eds. What Do We Owe Each Other?, New Brunswick, Transaction Press, 2008.

Rosenthal also published in scholarly journals such as the American Political Science Review, the American Journal of Political Science, the American Economic Review, and the ''Journal of Politics.

Awards
Rosenthal was a Fellow with the American Academy of Arts and a Sciences Fellow with the Society for Political Methodology. He also received the Duncan Black Award (with Thomas Romer) from the Public Choice Society in 1980 and the C.Q. Press Award (with Keith T. Poole) from the American Political Science Association in 1985, along with many other awards over the years.

References 

1939 births
2022 deaths
New York University faculty
American political scientists
MIT School of Humanities, Arts, and Social Sciences alumni
Carnegie Mellon University faculty
Princeton University faculty
Fellows of the Society for Political Methodology